College of Science and Technology  is a college located in Nouakchott, Mauritania. It is located south of Lebanese International University.

References

Universities in Mauritania
Nouakchott